Teo Lucas Halm (born May 18, 1999) is an American record producer, songwriter, singer, and actor. Halm's notable production credits include the Rosalía singles "Con Altura" with J Balvin and "TKN" with Travis Scott, the former which won a Latin Grammy Award, as well as two songs from the Beyoncé-produced The Lion King: The Gift.  As an actor, Halm is best known for starring in the 2014 film Earth to Echo.

Life and career
Teo Halm was born in Los Angeles, California. His mother's family is from France and Morocco and his father is Australian, of British and Czech descent.

Halm grew up performing in theater, performing in productions of The Sound of Music and The Music Man. Some of his first professional credits included a 2009 episode of the PBS series Nova and an UCLA alumni fundraising campaign. In the following years he appeared in a few short films. He was cast in a supporting role in the James Franco-directed Bukowski, an independent film adaption of Ham on Rye; the film was produced in early 2013 but was not distributed due to a copyright issue. Also in 2013, Halm was cast in the pilot of the Disney Channel Boy Meets World follow-up series Girl Meets World as Elliot, the son of Cory and Topanga; his character was ultimately cut from the series after the pilot was shot.

Halm had his most prominent film role in the 2014 sci-fi fantasy film Earth to Echo, for which he received top billing. The film premiered at the LA Film Festival and was released in theaters in July 2014. For his role as Alex, Halm received the Best Actor Award at the ninth annual PICK Awards. As a teenager, he had a supporting lead role in the movie Memoria, which premiered at the Austin Film Festival in 2015 and distributed in North America in 2016, and the film Camp starring Joey King and Nolan Gould. In 2018, Halm played the role of Theo in the independent feature film Spiral Farm; it premiered at Slamdance Film Festival in January 2019 during which it was nominated for Best Narrative Feature.

Since 2016, Halm has worked as a record producer and songwriter, and often collaborates with producers Michael Uzowuru, Frank Dukes, and Mark Ronson. In 2019, he was named to Billboard's 21 Under 21 list of songwriters and producers, having co-written the Latin Grammy-winning song "Con Altura" by Rosalia (featuring J Balvin) and co-writing and co-producing "Mood 4 Eva" by Beyoncé, Jay-Z and Childish Gambino, from the Grammy-nominated album The Lion King: The Gift. At the 2022 Juno Awards, Teo was nominated as a co-writer with Charlotte Day Wilson as Songwriter of the Year for "I Can Only Whisper." At the Latin Grammy Awards of 2022, Teo as a writer/producer of four songs on the Rosalia album Motomami won Album of the Year. As a songwriter, he is signed to Universal Music Publishing Group and Electric Feel Publishing.

Filmography

Discography

Singles
 "Ukiyo" (2016)
 "scumbag demo" (2017)
 "GIRL" (2017)
 "Today" (2018)
"Momma" (2018)

Production discography

Production and songwriting

Other credits 

Score of Guava Island (2019); guitar, trombone, bass guitar
 Miley Cyrus – "Never Be Me" from Plastic Hearts (2020); keyboards
 Mustafa – "Stay Alive" from When Smoke Rises (2021); bass guitar
 Pearl & the Oysters – Flowerland (2021); engineer, guitar

References

External links

Living people
1999 births
21st-century American male actors
American male television actors
Male actors from California
American people of Moroccan descent